Patria is a 2020 Spanish historical drama web television limited series produced by Alea Media for HBO Europe, with participation from HBO Latin America, based on the novel of the same name by Fernando Aramburu. Created and written by Aitor Gabilondo, the series follows two women who used to be close friends and become estranged when the husband of one of them is killed by Basque terrorist group ETA. The first two episodes of the eight-part series premiered on September 27, 2020 on HBO Europe, HBO Go, HBO Now and HBO Max.

Cast 
 Elena Irureta as Bittori
 Ane Gabarain as Miren
 Loreto Mauleón as Arantxa
 Eneko Sagardoy as Gorka
 Susana Abaitua as Nerea
 Mikel Laskurain as Joxian
 José Ramón Soroiz as Txato
 Íñigo Aranbarri as Xabier
 Jon Olivares as Joxe Mari
 Alvar Gordejuela as Juancar
 Fernando Guallar as Quique
 Begoña Maestre as Aránzazu

Episodes

Release 
The series was originally scheduled for a May 17, 2020 release but, due to the COVID-19 pandemic, post-production could not be completed. The release date was delayed to September 27, 2020. The first two episodes were made available on streaming in twenty one European countries via HBO Europe, and in the United States, Latin America and the Caribbean via HBO Go, HBO Now and HBO Max. The rest of the episodes were released on a weekly basis. The series also aired on HBO Latino from September 30, 2020. For promotional purposes, the first episode also aired on free-to-air commercial channel Telecinco in Spain on September 29, 2020.

Prior to its streaming premiere, the series was screened in its entirety at the 2020 San Sebastián International Film Festival on September 18, 2020.

Canal+ acquired the rights to air the series in France.

Awards and nominations 

|-
! align= center rowspan="21" | 2021
| rowspan=3 | Forqué Awards
| Best TV Series
| Patria
| 
| align = "center" | 
|-
| rowspan = 2 | Best Actress in a TV Series
| Elena Irureta
| 
| align = "center" | 
|-
| 
| 
| align = "center" | 
|-
| rowspan = 5 | 8th  || colspan = 2 | Best Miniseries ||  || align = "center" rowspan = "5" | 
|-
| Best Screenplay || Aitor Gabilondo || 
|-
| Best Direction || Óscar Pedraza & Félix Viscarret || 
|-
| rowspan = 2 | Best Drama Actress || Ane Gabarain || rowspan=2 
|-
| Elena Irureta
|-
| rowspan = 7 | 8th Feroz Awards || colspan = 2 | Best Drama Series ||  || align = "center" rowspan = "7" | 
|-
| rowspan = 2 | Best Lead Actress in a TV Series || Ane Gabarain || 
|-
| Elena Irureta || 
|-
| rowspan = 2 | Best Supporting Actress in a TV Series || Susana Abaitua || 
|-
| Loreto Mauleón || 
|-
| rowspan = 2 | Best Supporting Actor in a TV Series || Mikel Laskurain || 
|-
| Eneko Sagardoy || 
|-
| rowspan = "5" | 8th Platino Awards || Best Ibero-American Miniseries or TV series || Patria ||  || rowspan = "5" | 
|-
| Best Series Creator || Aitor Gabilondo || 
|-
| Best Actress in a Miniseries or TV series || Elena Irureta || 
|-
| rowspan = "2" | Best Supporting Actress in a Miniseries or TV series || Loreto Mauleón || 
|-
| Susana Abaitua || 
|-
| 49th International Emmy Awards || Best Actress || Ane Gabarain ||  || 
|}

References

External links

2020s Spanish drama television series
2020 Spanish television series debuts
2020 Spanish television series endings
HBO Europe original programming
Spanish-language television shows
Television series about the history of Spain
Spanish television series about terrorism